Alopoglossus indigenorum is a species of lizard in the family Alopoglossidae. It is found in Brazil.

References

Alopoglossus
Reptiles described in 2021
Taxa named by Marco Antônio Ribeiro Jr.
Taxa named by Fernanda P. Werneck